Pierre Marraud was a French politician born in Port-Sainte-Marie, Lot-et-Garonne, 8 January 1861, died in Paris 13 March 1958.

Préfet in 1900, Councillor of State, commissaire du gouvernement at the end of the First World War until becoming prefect of Seine-Inférieure (now Seine-Maritime) in 1918.
Senator for Lot-et-Garonne from 1920 to 1933.
Interior Minister from 16 January 1921 to 15 January 1922 in the 7th Aristide Briand government.
Minister for public instruction and fine arts from 11 November 1928 to 13 December 1930 in the 5th Raymond Poincaré government, 11th Aristide Briand government, 1st André Tardieu government and the 2nd André Tardieu government, he introduced, on 16 April 1930, the law which introduced free secondary education. *Conseiller général of Beauville and president of the conseil général of Lot-et-Garonne from 1921 to 1933.

1861 births
1958 deaths
People from Lot-et-Garonne
Politicians from Nouvelle-Aquitaine
Radical Party (France) politicians
French interior ministers
French Ministers of National Education
French Senators of the Third Republic
Senators of Lot-et-Garonne
Prefects of Seine-Maritime